The 2016 GP3 Series was the seventh season of the third-tier of Formula One feeder championship and also seventh season under the moniker of GP3 Series, a motor racing feeder series that runs in support of the 2016 FIA Formula One World Championship and sister series GP2. In keeping with the series' philosophy of updating its technical regulations every three years, the Dallara GP3/13 chassis introduced in the 2013 season was discontinued and Dallara supplied all teams with a new model known as the GP3/16, which will be used until 2018.

Mecachrome took over as official engine supplier of the series from 2016 onwards, replacing AER after three years but the 3.4-litre V6 naturally-aspirated would remain.

ART Grand Prix started the season as the defending teams' champions, and successfully defended their title, securing the championship after the first race at Monza. Monegasque driver Charles Leclerc, who drove for ART Grand Prix, won the drivers' title after the first race in the final round in Abu Dhabi.

The most races were won by runner-up Alexander Albon, who scored 4 race wins, he lost the title by 25 points to his ART Grand Prix teammate Charles Leclerc who took 3 feature race wins; Antonio Fuoco took 2 race wins, Jake Dennis and Nyck de Vries also took 2 podiums each on the top step. Jake Hughes took 2 sprint race wins; he won in Hockenheim and Yas Marina. Jack Aitken, Matthew Parry, and Ralph Boschung each took 1 race win during the season.

Teams and drivers
Teams are allowed to run four cars to compensate for the drop in the number of entries. The starting grid for any individual race meeting may contain a possible maximum of 28 cars across seven teams.

Driver changes
Entering GP3
 Alexander Albon, who finished seventh in the 2015 European Formula 3 season, entered the series, with ART Grand Prix.
 Giuliano Alesi, son of former Formula One driver Jean Alesi, graduated to the series from French F4 with Trident, with backing from Scuderia Ferrari.
 2015 Formula Renault 2.0 Alps runner-up Jake Hughes, 2015 Formula Renault 2.0 NEC runner-up Kevin Jörg and European Formula 3 driver Santino Ferrucci joined the series with newcomers DAMS.
 Jake Dennis, who finished third in the 2015 European Formula 3 season, entered the series with Arden International.
 Matevos Isaakyan, who contested the last two rounds of the 2015 season for Koiranen GP, moved to the series full-time with the team.
 2015 Euroformula Open runner-up Konstantin Tereshchenko and 2015 Renault Sport Trophy runner-up Steijn Schothorst joined the series with Campos Racing.
 2015 Eurocup Formula Renault 2.0 and Alps champion Jack Aitken graduated to the series with Arden.
 2015 European Formula 3 entrant and 2015–16 MRF Challenge runner-up Tatiana Calderón entered the series with Arden International.
 Nirei Fukuzumi, who finished fourth in Japanese F3 in 2015, stepped up to the series with ART Grand Prix.
 European Formula 3 driver Mahaveer Raghunathan joined the series with Koiranen.
 2015 European Formula 3 rookie champion Charles Leclerc, who finished fourth, entered the series with ART, with backing from Scuderia Ferrari.
 2015 MotorSport Vision Formula Three Cup and Asian Le Mans Series runner-up Akash Nandy moved to the series with Jenzer Motorsport.
 McLaren junior driver Nyck de Vries, who finished third in the 2015 Formula Renault 3.5 Series season, joined the series with ART Grand Prix.

Changing teams
 Antonio Fuoco and Sandy Stuvik, who raced with Carlin and Status Grand Prix in 2015 respectively, switched to Trident.
 Ralph Boschung, who raced with Jenzer in 2015, moved to Koiranen.
 Óscar Tunjo, who won race at Spielberg with Trident in 2015, switched to Jenzer.

Leaving GP3
 Aleksander Bosak, who competed for Arden International in the 2015 season, switched to Formula V8 3.5 with Pons Racing.
 2015 runner-up Luca Ghiotto left the series to continue his collaboration with  Trident in GP2 Series, while Marvin Kirchhöfer, who finished behind Ghiotto also graduated to GP2 with Carlin.
 Jann Mardenborough, who finished ninth for Carlin in 2015, left the series to compete in both Super GT and All-Japan F3.
 Seb Morris, who raced with Status Grand Prix in the 2015 season, left the series to race in British GT with Team Parker Racing.
 2015 season champion Esteban Ocon left the series as the reigning champion is not permitted to continue competing in the series. He joined the DTM with Mercedes-Benz.
Mid-season changes
 European Formula 3 driver Arjun Maini replaced Óscar Tunjo at Jenzer Motorsport from the Silverstone round onwards.
 Ralph Boschung was replaced by 2015 SMP F4 Championship winner Niko Kari, for the Spa round, with the team citing financial reasons for the decision.
 Alessio Lorandi joined Jenzer Motorsport for the last two rounds at Sepang and Yas Marina.

Team changes
 After having competed in the series since its inaugural season, Carlin and Status Grand Prix left the championship due to lack of sponsorships.
 DAMS, which operates across multiple single-seater championships, left Formula Renault 3.5 Series to join the GP3 series.
 Virtuosi Racing were scheduled to enter, but were removed from the entry list before the season.

Calendar
On 4 March 2016, the full calendar was revealed with nine rounds taking place.

Calendar changes
 The series will return to the Hockenheimring in support of the German Grand Prix, and will make its début at the Sepang International Circuit.
 The rounds at the Sochi Autodrom and the Bahrain International Circuit were discontinued for the 2016 season.

Results

Season summary

Championship standings

Scoring system
Points were awarded to the top 10 classified finishers in the race 1, and to the top 8 classified finishers in the race 2. The pole-sitter in the race 1 also received four points, and two points were given to the driver who set the fastest lap inside the top ten in both the race 1 and race 2. No extra points were awarded to the pole-sitter in the race 2.

Race 1 points

Race 2 points
Points were awarded to the top 8 classified finishers.

Drivers' championship

Notes:
† — Drivers did not finish the race, but were classified as they completed over 90% of the race distance.

Teams' championship
Only three best-finishing cars are allowed to score points in the championship.

Notes:
† — Drivers did not finish the race, but were classified as they completed over 90% of the race distance.

Footnotes

References

External links
 

GP3
GP3 Series seasons
GP3
GP3 Series